Christmas in the Sand is a Christmas album and the fourth studio album by American singer-songwriter Colbie Caillat. The album was released on October 23, 2012 in the United States through Universal Republic Records. The album includes eight cover versions of popular holiday songs and four original songs written by Caillat along with other songwriters. Produced by Ken Caillat, the album features collaborations with Brad Paisley, Gavin DeGraw, Justin Young and Jason Reeves. The first single "Christmas in the Sand" was released through SoundCloud on October 15, 2012 and  "Merry Christmas Baby" was released on October 16, 2012, which features country music artist Brad Paisley. The album also has a deluxe edition, that was released through Target and that includes three bonus tracks. This is the last album that Caillat released on Universal Republic Records; her future material would be released through Republic Records.

Background and composition
Caillat told Billboard her holiday album was dedicated for those whose Christmases aren't the traditional kind of Christmas,  "I was like, 'Not everyone lives in the snow or cold places for Christmas, so why don't we write some songs for them to be able to relate to what their Christmas is like'". Fittingly, Caillat recorded "Christmas in the Sand" "in my bathing suit in the sunshine in southern California in the summertime...between takes of going swimming with my mom and our dogs." The album, she says had been broached by her label in the past, but with six months off at the beginning of this year she felt like it was "a perfect time to put my focus and attention on it and decide how many songs I wanted, which songs and to write songs for it." A lot of the songs I wrote for it are about how not every (winter) holiday I spent has been only in the snow," Caillat explains. "It's also been in the sun and at the beach and a different kind of lifestyle (that) not everyone has. I wanted to tap into that. It's fun to write a Christmas song from that perspective."

The album, produced by her father Ken, includes five originals and 10 holiday standards, as well as guest appearances by Brad Paisley on a rocking "Merry Christmas Baby" and Gavin DeGraw, who ad libs his way through what Caillat calls a "hilarious" version of "Baby, It's Cold Outside". Vocals recorded on Tour at Playback Recording Studio." he wrote the love song "Everyday is Christmas" with Jason Reeves and Kara DioGuardi, while "Mistletoe", composed with Stacy Blue and Mikal Blue, was released a stand-alone single in 2007. And "Happy Christmas," a co-write with Toby Gad, recalls traditional, snowy Christmases at Caillat's grandparents' home in Lake Tahoe. "I've experienced that typical kind of Christmas as well, so I wanted to write a little bit of both sides," Caillat says.

Critical reception

Linny's Vault described Colbie's performance in this album "her voice reminds me of fellow singer songwriter Sara Bareilles so if you're a fan of hers you'll definitely be pleased with this album". Stephen Thomas Erlewine of Starpulse described the whole album as 'lively, cheerful, and bright, the sound of the season for climates where there's nary a cloud in the sky' and also said 'she actually rocks a little bit harder here than usual, letting her duet partner Brad Paisley goose "Merry Christmas Baby" with his gnarly Telecaster and giving "Winter Wonderland" an insistent electronic pulse, elements that make Christmas in the Sand a little livelier than either of her full-length platters, but the casual brilliance of this unassuming but thoroughly entertaining holiday album is that it has a genuine personality', and gave the album 4.5 out of 5 stars.

Promotion
To promote the album, Caillat scheduled a week of holiday shows at the end of November and beginning of December, plus a series of TV appearances. She was a part of the CMA Country Christmas special along with another artists.

Track listing
All tracks produced by Ken Caillat.

Personnel

 Ken Caillat – producer, mixing, engineer
 Colbie Caillat – producer, vocals, background vocals
 Ghian Wright – engineer, additional music direction, mixing
 Greg Metcalf – photography
 Eric Berdon – additional engineer, guitars, keyboards, humm choir (only on Auld Lang Syne)
 Gregg Sartiano – additional engineer
 Chris Steffen – additional engineer
 Neal Capellino – additional engineer (only on Merry Christmas Baby)
 Tucker Bodine – additional engineer (only on Baby, It's Cold Outside with Gavin DeGraw)
 Brian David Willis – assistant engineer (only on Merry Christmas Baby)
 Eric Boulanger – mixing, mastering, violin
 Joe Zook – mixing (only on Christmas In The Sand)
 Doug Sax – mastering
 Victor Indrizzo – drums, percussion
 Tim Pierce – bass, guitars
 Sean Hurley – bass
 Greg Suran – guitars
 Jason Reeves – guitars, vocals, background vocals
 Justin Young – guitars, vocals, background vocals
 Gavin DeGraw – vocals, background vocals
 Patrick Warren – keyboards, programming
 Jamie Muhoberac – keyboards, programming
 Kim Bullard – keyboards, programming
 Michael "Smidi" Smith – keyboards
 Denosh Bennett – background vocals
 Stevvi Alexander – background vocals
 Annaliese Wolverton – background vocals
 Makepeace brothers – humm choir (only on Auld Lang Syne)
 Noah Needleman – humm choir (only on Auld Lang Syne)
 Sonus Quartet – strings
 Caroline Campbell – violin
 Kathleen Sloan – violin
 Elizabeth Hedman – violin
 Juan Miguel Hernández – viola
 Victor de Almeida – viola
 Vanessa Freebrairn-Smith – cello
 Paula Hochhalter – cello
 Sari Sutcliffe – contracting & album co-ordination
 Sandra Brummels – art direction
 Christopher Kornmann – graphic design

Charts

References

2012 Christmas albums
Colbie Caillat albums
Universal Republic Records albums
Christmas albums by American artists
Albums produced by Ken Caillat
Pop rock Christmas albums